Edita Liachovičiūtė (born 7 April 1976) is a Lithuanian former professional tennis player.

A left-handed player from Palanga, Liachovičiūtė made her Federation Cup debut for Lithuania in 1992. She appeared in a total of 29 Fed Cup ties, amassing ten singles and nine doubles wins. Since the Europe/Africa zone was split into different tiers in 1995 she always competed in Group II, until Lithuania overcame Portugal in the 2003 playoffs, with her win over Frederica Piedade securing promotion. The 2004 season in Group I was her final year of Fed Cup tennis.

Liachovičiūtė, who won two ITF doubles titles, now works as a tennis coach and has been a long serving captain of the Lithuania Fed Cup team, as well as running her own academy in Vilnius.

ITF finals

Singles: 2 (0–2)

Doubles: 3 (2–1)

References

External links
 
 
 

1976 births
Living people
Lithuanian female tennis players
Sportspeople from Palanga